The 1979 Dwars door België was the 34th edition of the Dwars door Vlaanderen cycle race and was held on 25 March 1979. The race started and finished in Waregem. The race was won by Gustaaf Van Roosbroeck.

General classification

References

1979
1979 in road cycling
1979 in Belgian sport